Thulium(III) oxide is a pale green solid compound, with the formula Tm2O3. It was first isolated in 1879, from an impure sample of erbia, by Swedish chemist Per Teodor Cleve, who named it thulia.
It can be prepared in the laboratory by burning thulium metal in air, or by decomposition of their oxoacid salts, such as thulium nitrate.

References

Thulium compounds
Sesquioxides